Howell Bush Stadium at Averitt Express Baseball Complex is a baseball venue in Cookeville, Tennessee, United States.  It is home to the Tennessee Tech Golden Eagles baseball team of the NCAA Division I Ohio Valley Conference.  It has a capacity of 1,100 spectators.  It is named for former Tennessee Tech baseball and basketball player Howell Bush, whose 1997 donation allowed stadium lighting to be added to the facility.  In the same year, the stadium was dedicated to him.  Other features of the venue include dugouts, a batter's eye, a natural grass surface, and a locker room.

See also 
 List of NCAA Division I baseball venues

References 

College baseball venues in the United States
Baseball venues in Tennessee
Tennessee Tech Golden Eagles baseball
Buildings and structures in Putnam County, Tennessee